Confidencial is a Nicaraguan weekly newspaper in Nicaragua with offices in the capital Managua. It was founded in 1996 by Carlos Fernando Chamorro Barrios, Chamorro is the former director of the Sandinista National Liberation Front newspaper Barricada and son of Pedro Joaquín Chamorro Cardenal, Nicaraguan journalist and former editor of La Prensa who was murdered in the last year of the Somoza rule, influencing public sympathy for the FSLN rebels.

Confidencial was known for its investigative journalism and critical analysis, a legacy that persists, but appears in the form of online. The publication is often evaluated as an independent news agency operated by a small editorial team, as opposed to the Nicaragua's Sandinista government.

Confidencial has two associated television news programs, “This Evening” and “This Week”.

In December 2018 the National Police of Nicaragua killed a journalist, detained two others and ransacked the office of Confidencial, taking its press room.

International cooperation 
Confidencial cooperates with the independent Cuba-focused magazine Havana Times, which is also based in Nicaragua. Circles Robinson, editor of the Havana Times, is a columnist of Confidencial.

See also 

 Pedro Molina (caricarurist)

References

External links
Confidencial website (Spanish)

1996 establishments in Nicaragua
Mass media in Managua
Weekly newspapers published in Nicaragua
Nicaraguan news websites
Newspapers established in 1996
Spanish-language newspapers